Santiago Amorín Calegari (born 9 September 1994) is a Uruguayan footballer who plays as a goalkeeper for Liverpool F.C. (Montevideo) in the Uruguayan Primera División.

References

External links
Profile at Football Database

1994 births
Living people
C.A. Progreso players
Central Español players
Uruguayan Segunda División players
Uruguayan footballers
Association football goalkeepers